Jerneja Perc (17 February 1971 – 29 November 2009) was a Slovenian sprinter who specialized in the 100 metres.

She won a bronze medal in 60 metres at the 1996 European Indoor Championships.

She participated at the 1995 World Indoor Championships, the 1995 World Championships and the 1997 World Indoor Championships without reaching the finals.

She died on 29 November 2009 after a long illness.

References

External links

1971 births
2009 deaths
Slovenian female sprinters
Place of birth missing